Steven Cummings (born 16 August 1969) is a former Australian rules footballer who played with St Kilda in the Australian Football League (AFL).

Cummings started his career at the Frankston Bombers and also played for Noble Park, but was drafted from Sandringham. He appeared in three seasons for St Kilda.

References

External links
 
 

1969 births
Australian rules footballers from Victoria (Australia)
St Kilda Football Club players
Frankston Bombers players
Sandringham Football Club players
Living people